Steven James Grogan (born July 24, 1953) is a former football quarterback who played in the National Football League (NFL) for sixteen seasons with the New England Patriots. He played college football at Kansas State University and was selected by the Patriots in the fifth round of the 1975 NFL Draft.

An agile, durable dual-threat quarterback in an era known for pocket passers, he led the league in both passing and quarterback rushing statistics several times in his career, and ran for a quarterback-record 12 touchdowns in 1976, a record that stood for 35 seasons. Grogan ran for over 500 yards in 1978 and led the team to 3,156 rushing yards, an NFL record that was only eclipsed by the 2019 Baltimore Ravens.  He had his statistically best year in 1979, before being hobbled by injuries for much of the 1980s.  While he showed moments of brilliance, and continued to be a fan favorite for his tenacious style of play, he would only have one season during the rest of his career, 1983, when he started more than half of his team's games, and would spend the majority of the rest of his career splitting starting time with a number of other quarterbacks.  He played in Super Bowl XX, coming off the bench to throw a pass for the only touchdown the Patriots would score on the day.  When he retired in 1990, he held many of the team's passing and longevity records.

He was inducted into the New England Patriots Hall of Fame in 1995, and currently owns a sporting goods store in Massachusetts.

High school and college
Grogan had a standout prep career in Kansas at Ottawa High School, where he led his team to state titles in track in 1970, basketball in 1971, and a 3A state runner-up finish in football in 1970.

Grogan spent his collegiate career at Kansas State University, where he started as a quarterback for his junior and senior years. He threw for 2,214 yards, completing 166 of 371 pass attempts, with 12 TDs and 26 interceptions. He ran for 585 yards and six touchdowns on 339 attempts, punted 7 times for 279 yards (a 39.9-yard average), and as a senior caught one touchdown pass of 22 yards.  Against Memphis in 1973, he had a 100-yard rushing game.

Professional career

1975–1979: initial successes
Grogan was selected in the fifth round (116th overall) in the 1975 NFL Draft by the New England Patriots. Although he would start every game for four consecutive seasons early in his career, his career was also marked by injuries and quarterback controversies, with Grogan competing with other quarterbacks for the starting job. His second through his fifth season were the only times he would start every game in a season. Besides taking the starting job from former Heisman Trophy winner Jim Plunkett as a rookie, Grogan would later face competition from Matt Cavanaugh, Tony Eason, Heisman Trophy winner Doug Flutie, and Marc Wilson.

In his first season, Grogan played in 13 games out of the then-14 game regular season, starting 7 of the last 8. Grogan threw for 1,976 yards, 11 touchdowns and 18 interceptions. The Patriots finished with a 3-11 record, and traded Plunkett, their starter for the previous four years, in the off-season. (Plunkett would eventually lead the Raiders to two Super Bowl victories.)

For the Patriots 1976 season, Grogan led the Patriots to an 11-3 record and the franchise's first playoff berth since 1963. The eleven wins were the most Patriots wins in a season since the club’s inception. Along the way the Patriots defeated the defending Super Bowl champion, Pittsburgh Steelers (30-27).  They also handed the Oakland Raiders their only regular season loss that year by defeating them 48-17.  However, they lost the divisional playoffs (24-21) to the Raiders. Grogan scored 12 rushing touchdowns in 1976, breaking a quarterback record of 11 previously held by Tobin Rote and Johnny Lujack.  His record would stand for 35 years until broken by Carolina Panthers quarterback Cam Newton's 14 in 2011.

During the 1977 season, Grogan would continue to advance the ball with his legs, amassing another 300+ yard rushing season, though he would only find the end zone once on a running play, as running backs Horace Ivory, Sam "Bam" Cunningham and Andy Johnson did most of the scoring on the ground.  Rookie Stanley Morgan was drafted in the first round of that year's draft, and became an instant favorite target for Grogan; the two would go on to become the most successful tandem in Patriots history by the time of their retirements.  The team would slip from their prior successes, however, falling to 9-5 and missing the playoffs.

In the Patriots 1978 season, Grogan led the Patriots to an 11-5 record, a division title and the organization's first ever home playoff game, a 31–14 loss to the Houston Oilers. The Patriots set the all-time single season team rushing record with 3,156 yards (Grogan rushing for 539 yards and 5 touchdowns himself), a record that stood until broken by the 2019 Baltimore Ravens. It is also the only season an NFL team has had 4 players rush for over 500 yards apiece.

Statistically, Grogan's best season was the Patriots 1979 season, when he completed 206 of 423 passes for 3,286 yards and 28 touchdowns, rushing for 368 yards and 2 touchdowns. His 28 touchdown passes led the league, tied with Brian Sipe of Cleveland, and his rushing yards led the league for quarterbacks.  The Patriots struggled defensively and could not hold on to leads provided to them by Grogan, and finished with a disappointing 9-7 record, missing the playoffs.

1980–1985: injuries and recovery
In the early 1980s, Grogan suffered several injuries, and split starting duties on-and-off with Matt Cavanaugh.  During the lean years of the early 1980s, the Patriots failed to make the playoffs in 1980 and 1981 (when they had a dreadful 2-14 record), only making the tournament during the strike-shortened 1982 season.  The years were statistically lackluster years for Grogan, as the formerly mobile dual-threat quarterback was hobbled by knee injuries, and was uncomfortable in his new role as a pocket passer. The Patriots drafted quarterback Tony Eason in the first round of the 1983 NFL Draft.  As the highly touted Eason put the pressure on Grogan to perform, he returned to form during the 1983 season, but was replaced by Eason as the primary starter in 1984 after a 1-2 start, where Grogan played entirely ineffectually for the two losses in weeks two and three of the season.

By the Patriots 1985 season, Eason had taken the starting quarterback position and led the Patriots to a 2–3 record initially. Coach Raymond Berry benched Eason for Grogan. The Patriots won 6 straight games behind their old quarterback, only to lose Grogan when he suffered a broken leg in Week 12 against the New York Jets. Filling in again at QB, Eason and the Patriots lost that Jets game 16-13 in overtime, and relinquished 1st place in the AFC East Division. With Eason's return, the Patriots went 3-2 in their remaining five games. Finishing the season with an 11-5 record, the Patriots earned a wild card berth into the playoffs and eventually reached Super Bowl XX, where they faced the Chicago Bears, who,  with their defensive coach Buddy Ryan's "46" defense, had gone 15–1 during the regular season. Eason, who had led the Patriots to victory in the wild card, divisional, and conference playoff games, started the game, but the Patriots could do little against the Bears' defense and Eason went 0-6 in passing attempts;  Coach Berry replaced him with Grogan. Grogan went on to connect on 17 of 30 passes for 177 yards, a touchdown, but also two interceptions, in the 46-10 loss. Of little solace was the fact that the Patriots were the only team to score against the Bears in the playoffs that season.

1986–1990: the end of his career 

Eason returned to the full-time starter position for the 1986 season, while Grogan appeared in only 4 games (two as a starter) when Eason was injured.  For the rest of the 1980s, the team became a revolving door of starting quarterbacks, as Grogan battled for playing time not only with Eason, but also with backup Tom Ramsey, local hero and fan favorite Doug Flutie, and journeyman Marc Wilson.  The Patriots struggled to remain above .500 for the final four years of his career, culminating in the disastrous and controversial 1-15 campaign of 1990, after which Grogan retired.

Retirement and legacy
At the time of his retirement, Grogan led the franchise as the all-time leader in passing yards (26,886) and passing touchdowns (182). As of 2019, he is ranked third in passing yards behind Tom Brady and Drew Bledsoe and second in passing touchdowns behind Brady. His 16 seasons are the second most ever for a Patriots player, behind Tom Brady. He also held the Patriots previous single-game record with a 153.9 quarterback rating, achieved by completing 13-of-18 passes for 315 yards with five touchdowns and no interceptions against the New York Jets on September 9, 1979, before Drew Bledsoe posted a perfect 158.3 rating against the Indianapolis Colts on December 26, 1993.

Grogan started seventy-six consecutive games for the Patriots from 1975-1980, which would place him twenty-sixth for Most consecutive starts by a quarterback (NFL).  He was knocked out of the top twenty-five by Brady.

Grogan rushed for 2,176 yards (4.9 per carry) and 35 touchdowns during his career, a mark which places him as the Patriots' fourth overall in rushing touchdowns. With Grogan, the Patriots made the playoffs five times (1976, 1978, 1982, 1985, and 1986 as a backup). Before Grogan was drafted, the Patriots made the playoffs just once from 1960-1974.

Grogan's injuries and his toughness in response to them are also part of his legacy. One sports writer for the Boston Globe, wrote of the "Grogan Toughness Meter" in 2003. The writer, Nick Cafardo, gave a partial listing of Grogan's injuries over his 16-year career: "Five knee surgeries; screws in his leg after the tip of his fibula snapped; a cracked fibula that snapped when he tried to practice; two ruptured disks in his neck, which he played with for 1 1/2 seasons; a broken left hand (he simply handed off with his right hand); two separated shoulders on each side; the reattachment of a tendon to his throwing elbow; and three concussions."

After football 

After retiring from the Patriots, Grogan attempted to get a coaching job, but found that no one above the high school level would hire him.  He was approached by the then-owner of Marciano Sporting Goods in Mansfield, Massachusetts (a business originally started by Rocky Marciano's brother Peter) to purchase the struggling business from him.  Living only five miles from the store, and seeing it as a good investment, Grogan agreed to purchase the store, renamed it Grogan Marciano Sporting Goods, and continues to run the business today.  Other than running his business, he also makes appearances at local businesses and civic organizations.

NFL career statistics

Regular season

Playoffs

Honors
Grogan's high school, Ottawa High School in Ottawa, Kansas has named its football stadium after him, and he was also inducted into the Kansas State Sports Hall of Fame in 1999.

Kansas State has retired the number Grogan wore for the Wildcats, #11, to jointly honor him and Lynn Dickey, who also wore #11. It is the only number retired by Kansas State. (Grogan wore #14 with the Patriots.)

Grogan was named to the Patriots 35th Anniversary Team in 1994, and was elected into the Patriots Hall of Fame in 1995. He was also elected to the Patriot's All-Decade teams of the 1970s and the 1980s.

Notes and references

External links
 New England Patriots bio

1953 births
Living people
American football quarterbacks
Kansas State Wildcats football players
New England Patriots players
People from Ottawa, Kansas
Players of American football from San Antonio
Ed Block Courage Award recipients